Koleh Bid (also Romanized as Koleh Bīd and Kolahbīd) is a village in Jowzan Rural District, in the Central District of Malayer County, Hamadan Province, Iran. At the 2006 census, its population was 70, in 19 families.

References 

Populated places in Malayer County